Denisa Helceletová, formerly Rosolová, née Ščerbová (born 21 August 1986 in Karviná, Czechoslovakia) is a Czech former athlete who has won medals at the European Championships and European Indoor Championships.

Biography

Rosolová's main event is the long jump, but she also competes in heptathlon. Her best are 6.68 m in the long jump (July 2004 in Grosseto) and 5,828 points in the heptathlon (July 2006 in Tábor). Since 2001, she has been a member of AK SSK Vítkovice, an athletic club in Ostrava; her coach is Aleš Duda.

Rosolová took the silver medal in the long jump at the 2003 U17 World Championships in Sherbrooke and won the gold medal in the long jump at the 2004 World Junior Championships in Grosseto. She came 25th in the long jump at the 2004 Summer Olympics in Athens. She also competed in the heptathlon at the 2006 European Championships in Gothenburg but had to pull out because of an ankle injury.

At the 2007 European Indoor Championships in Birmingham, Rosolová matched her Czech indoor long jump record of 6.64 m and came in third, beating Bianca Kappler by one centimetre and winning her first major senior medal. As of March 2007, she was several-time champion of the Czech Republic (one outdoor and three indoor titles in the long jump and one title in the heptathlon). In February 2008 she improved her own indoor national record in pentathlon to 4632 points. In 2012, Rosolová started to compete in the 400 m hurdles and in her first season, she almost beat Zuzana Hejnová's national record.

Rosolová won a bronze medal with the Czech 4x400 metres relay at the 2013 European Athletics Indoor Championships.

Personal life
In November 2008 she married tennis player Lukáš Rosol. In 2011, they divorced. On 7 November 2017 Rosolová announced her pregnancy and an end of her athletic career. On 15 June 2019 she married athlete Adam Helcelet.

References

External links
 Denisa Rosolová, Strong, fast and so beautiful! a Czech 400m runner on YouTube
 Interview and photo gallery at Xman.cz 
 

1986 births
Living people
Czech heptathletes
Czech female long jumpers
Czech female hurdlers
Athletes (track and field) at the 2004 Summer Olympics
Athletes (track and field) at the 2008 Summer Olympics
Athletes (track and field) at the 2012 Summer Olympics
Athletes (track and field) at the 2016 Summer Olympics
Olympic athletes of the Czech Republic
European Athletics Championships medalists
Sportspeople from Karviná
World Athletics Championships athletes for the Czech Republic
World Athletics Indoor Championships medalists
20th-century Czech women
21st-century Czech women